Jamaica competed at the 2020 Summer Olympics in Tokyo. Originally scheduled to take place from 24 July to 9 August 2020, the Games were postponed to 23 July to 8 August 2021, because of the COVID-19 pandemic. The country's participation marked its seventeenth Summer Olympic appearance as an independent state, although it has previously competed in four other editions as a British colony, and as part of the West Indies Federation.

Medalists

Competitors
The following is the list of number of competitors participating in the Games:

Athletics

Jamaican athletes further achieved the entry standards, either by qualifying time or by world ranking, in the following track and field events (up to a maximum of 3 athletes in each event):

Track & road events
Men

Women

Mixed

Field events
Men

Women

Boxing

Jamaica entered one boxer into the Olympic tournament for the first time since 1996. With the cancellation of the 2021 Pan American Qualification Tournament in Buenos Aires, Argentina, Ricardo Brown finished fourth in the men's super heavyweight division to secure a place on the Jamaican team based on the IOC's Boxing Task Force Rankings.

Diving

Jamaica entered one diver into the Olympic competition by finishing in the top eighteen of the men's springboard at the 2021 FINA Diving World Cup in Tokyo, Japan.

Gymnastics

Artistic
Jamaica entered one artistic gymnast into the Olympic competition. British-born Danusia Francis booked a spot in the women's individual all-around and apparatus events, by finishing ninth out of the twenty gymnasts eligible for qualification at the 2019 World Championships in Stuttgart, Germany.

Two days prior to the competition Francis learned she had torn her anterior cruciate ligament. She therefore withdrew from the balance beam, the vault and the floor exercise. She chose to continue to compete in the uneven bars with her knee bandaged, scoring the lowest of any competitor as the judges deducted 6.5 points for various infractions and gave her only a 0.5 difficulty score. However, her 9.033 execution score was the highest for any athlete on any apparatus.

Women

Judo

For the first time in history, Jamaica qualified one judoka for the women's middleweight category (70 kg) at the Games. Ebony Drysdale Daley accepted a continental berth from the Americas as the nation's top-ranked judoka outside of direct qualifying position in the IJF World Ranking List of June 28, 2021.

Swimming 

Jamaican swimmers further achieved qualifying standards in the following events (up to a maximum of 2 swimmers in each event at the Olympic Qualifying Time (OQT), and potentially 1 at the Olympic Selection Time (OST)):

See also
Jamaica at the 2019 Pan American Games

References

Nations at the 2020 Summer Olympics
2020
2021 in Jamaican sport